Miloš Kelemen (born 6 July 1999) is a Slovak professional ice hockey right winger for the Tucson Roadrunners in the American Hockey League (AHL) as a prospect to the Arizona Coyotes of the National Hockey League (NHL).

Playing career
Kelemen was a member of HKM Zvolen's academy before making his professional debut for the team during the 2016–17 season. On 2 July 2018, he signed for HC Slovan Bratislava of the Kontinental Hockey League but would play just two games during the 2018–19 KHL season before returning to HKM Zvolen. Kelemen signed a new contract with Zvolen on 17 June 2020. In the following 2020–21 season, Kelemen enjoyed a breakout season in recording career-high marks of 19 goals and 19 assists for 38 points in 45 regular season games. He contributed six post-season goals through 11 games to help HKM Zvolen claim the championship.

On 1 May 2021, Kelemen left Zvolen to continue his development and signed a contract with Czech Extraliga outfit, BK Mladá Boleslav. Quickly adjusting to the ELH in the 2021–22 season, using his size and scoring touch, Kelemen notched five goals and 18 points through 44 regular season games. He increased his production in the playoffs, helping Mladá Boleslav reach the semi-finals and finishing with nine goals and 12 points in just 14 post-season games. In recognition of his impressive year, Kelemen was selected as the Czech Extraliga's Rookie of the Year.

On 6 May 2022, Kelemen as an undrafted free agent, was signed to a two-year, entry-level contract with the Arizona Coyotes of the NHL.

International play

He was selected to make his full IIHF international debut, participating for Slovakia in the 2021 IIHF World Championship.

Career statistics

Regular season and playoffs

International

Awards and honors

References

External links
 

1999 births
Living people
Arizona Coyotes players
BK Mladá Boleslav players
Ice hockey players at the 2022 Winter Olympics
Medalists at the 2022 Winter Olympics
Olympic bronze medalists for Slovakia
Olympic medalists in ice hockey
Olympic ice hockey players of Slovakia
Sportspeople from Zvolen
Slovak ice hockey right wingers
HC Slovan Bratislava players
Tucson Roadrunners players
Undrafted National Hockey League players
HKM Zvolen players
Slovak expatriate ice hockey players in the United States
Slovak expatriate ice hockey players in the Czech Republic